Shahri Rahim (born in Singapore) is a former Singaporean footballer and president of National Football League second division club South Avenue.

References

Association football goalkeepers
Living people
Singaporean footballers
Year of birth missing (living people)